Lalitpur Airport is a proposed domestic airport and defunct airstrip in Lalitpur, Uttar Pradesh, India owned by the Airports Authority of India.

History
An Airstrip was built during World War 2 in Lalitpur, but has been defunct ever since. The state government has plans twice to develop the existing airstrip into an airport as there is a large amount of land around the airport. It is owned by central government's Airports Authority of India. Under state's current chief minister Yogi Adityanath, the Uttar Pradesh Government gave approval for the development of an airport in Lalitpur in March 2021.  A previous attempt by former chief minister of Uttar Pradesh, Akhilesh Yadav was made to develop the airstrip but the plans never took off.

References

Airports in Uttar Pradesh
Proposed airports in Uttar Pradesh
Defunct airports in India